The All-Lancaster Red Roses were an Eastern League of Professional Football team that played during the league's only year of existence, 1926. They finished third in the 10-team league with a 5-2-3 record (five wins, two losses and three ties). They played in the league championship against the Bethlehem Bears, and though they lost 3-0, the league still considered the Red-Roses the league champion.

References

American football teams established in 1926
Defunct American football teams in Pennsylvania
Sports clubs disestablished in 1926
1926 establishments in Pennsylvania
1926 disestablishments in Pennsylvania
Sports in Lancaster, Pennsylvania